Halsdon may refer to:
 The ancestral home of the Furse (surname) Furses of Devon
 A variation on the Bloodhound (cocktail)